The following are the appointments to various Canadian Honours of 2014. Usually, they are announced as part of the New Year and Canada Day celebrations and are published within the Canada Gazette during year. This follows the custom set out within the United Kingdom which publishes its appoints of various British Honours for New Year's and for monarch's official birthday. However, instead of the midyear appointments announced on Victoria Day, the official birthday of the Canadian Monarch, this custom has been transferred with the celebration of Canadian Confederation and the creation of the Order of Canada.

However, as the Canada Gazette publishes appointment to various orders, decorations and medal, either Canadian or from Commonwealth and foreign states, this article will reference all Canadians so honoured during the 2014 calendar year.

Provincial Honours are not listed within the Canada Gazette, however they are listed within the various publications of each provincial government. Provincial honours are listed within the page.

The Order of Canada

Termination of an appointment within the Order of Canada

 The Right Honourable Conrad Moffat Black, Baron Black of Crossharbour, KCSG
 Louis LaPierre

Companions of the Order of Canada
 The Honourable Marie Deschamps, C.C.
 The Right Honourable Donald Mazankowski, P.C., C.C., A.O.E. – This is a promotion within the Order
 The Honourable Margaret Norrie McCain, C.C., O.N.B. – This is a promotion within the Order
 R. Murray Schafer, C.C.

 David Cronenberg, C.C., O.Ont. – This is a promotion within the Order
 Richard Leigh Cruess, C.C., O.Q. – This is a promotion within the Order
 General Alfred John Gardyne Drummond de Chastelain, C.C., C.M.M., C.D., C.H. (Ret'd) – This is a promotion within the Order

Officers of the Order of Canada
 Michael Bliss, O.C. – This is a promotion within the Order
 Gilles Brassard, O.C.
 Douglas Coupland, O.C.
 Jim Cuddy, O.C.
 John Daniel, O.C.

 Colm Feore, O.C.
 Sherrill E. Grace, O.C.
 Nancy Jane Hermiston, O.C.
 Daniel Ish, O.C.
 David Jenkins, O.C.
 James Gregory Keelor, O.C.
 Patrick Delamere Lafferty, O.C.
 Steve Paikin, O.C.
 Eliot A. Phillipson, O.C.

 Sarah Polley, O.C.
 Glenn Pushelberg, O.C.
 Keren Rice, O.C.
 Hartley T. Richardson, O.C., O.M. – This is a promotion within the Order
 The Honourable J. J. Michel Robert, P.C., O.C.
 Michael Rudnicki, O.C.
 Daniel Walter Smith, O.C.
 John M. Thompson, O.C.
 Peter Tugwell, O.C.
 The Most Reverend V. James Weisgerber, O.C., S.O.M.
 George Yabu, O.C.
 Marion Bogo, O.C.
 Philip Branton, O.C.
 James Carter, O.C.
 G. Raymond Chang, O.C.
 Harvey Max Chochinov, O.C., O.M.
 Deborah Cook, O.C.
 Judson Graham Day, O.C., O.N.S., C.D.
 Jean-Marie De Koninck, O.C., C.Q. – This is a promotion within the Order
 David F. Denison, O.C.
 Gerald Finley, O.C.
 Susan French, O.C.
 David Goldbloom, O.C.
 Frederick William Gorbet, O.C. – This is a promotion within the Order

 Colonel Chris Austin Hadfield, O.C., O.Ont., M.S.C., C.D. (Ret'd)
 Harold John Jennings, O.C.
 Norman B. Keevil, O.C., O.B.C.

 Richard Vincent Mercer, O.C.
 Veena Rawat, O.C.
 Shirley Marie Tilghman, O.C.

Members of the Order of Canada
 Baha Abu-Laban, C.M.
 Ewan Affleck, C.M.
 Rina Arseneault, C.M.
 Louis Audet, C.M.
 Jeanne Beker, C.M.
 David F. Blair, C.M.
 Shirley Blumberg, C.M.
 Walter Boudreau, C.M., C.Q.
 Ron Burnett, C.M.

 Carmen Campagne, C.M.
 Paul G. S. Cantor, C.M.
 Stephen Carpenter, C.M.
 Denise Clarke, C.M.
 Dennis Cochrane, C.M.
 Marie-Éva de Villers, C.M., C.Q.
 Morton Doran, C.M.
 W. Yvon Dumont, C.M., O.M.
 Marc Dutil, C.M.
 Phil Dwyer, C.M.
 Louise Forestier, C.M.
 Madeleine Gagnon, C.M.
 Peter E. Gilgan, C.M., O.Ont.
 Michael Goldbloom, C.M.
 Philip R. Gosling, C.M.
 Bernard Grandmaître, C.M.
 Roger Greenberg, C.M.
 Catherine Anita Hankins, C.M.
 Morley Hanson, C.M.
 Robert Harding, C.M.
 Mary E. Hofstetter, C.M.
 James Dickinson Irvin, C.M.
 Elisapee Ishulutaq, C.M.
 George Jonas, C.M.
 Danielle Juteau, C.M.
 James Peter (Hamish) Kimmins, C.M.
 Lucia Kowaluk, C.M.
 Francine Lelièvre, C.M., C.Q.
 Douglas Letson, C.M.
 K. Barry Marsden, C.M.
 Murray D. McEwen, C.M.
 W. R. (Bob) McPhee, C.M.
 Djavad Mowafaghian, C.M., O.B.C.
 Wesley Nicol, C.M.
 Constance V. Pathy, C.M., C.Q.
 Juri Peepre, C.M.
 Louise Penny, C.M.
 John Derek Riley, C.M.
 Sandra Rotman, C.M., O.Ont.
 Aurel Schofield, C.M.
 Albert Schultz, C.M.
 Mamdouh Shoukri, C.M., O.Ont.
 Joan C. Snyder, C.M.
 Donald Creighton Rae Sobey, C.M.
 Eric S. Sprott, C.M.
 Jacques Tanguay, C.M.
 Ian Tannock, C.M.
 Tom Traves, C.M.
 Marie-José Turcotte, C.M.
 Sara Vered, C.M.
 William Robert Waters, C.M.
 Robin Williams, C.M.
 Mary Elyse Allan, C.M.
 Kim Baird, C.M.

 The Honourable Gordon L. Barnhart, C.M., S.O.M.
 James W. Borcoman, C.M.
 Brigadier-General Pierre G. Boutet, C.M., C.M.M., C.D. (Ret'd)
 Marcia Ann Boyd, C.M.
 Guy Breton, C.M.
 Vickie Cammack, C.M., M.S.M.
 Norman R. C. Campbell, C.M.
 Timothy W. Casgrain, C.M.
 Jean Chamberlain Froese, C.M.
 Earlaine Collins, C.M.
 Eleanor Collins, C.M.
 Victor Davies, C.M.
 Denise Desautels, C.M.
 François Dompierre, C.M.
 Terrence J. Donnelly, C.M., O.Ont.
 Anthony N. Doob, C.M.
 David K. Elton, C.M.
 Allan B. Etmanski, C.M., M.S.M.
 Lucinda Flemer, C.M.
 Cyril Basil Frank, C.M.
 Irene Fraser, C.M.
 Ross Gaudreault, C.M., O.Q.
 Christiane Germain, C.M., C.Q.
 Jean Giguère, C.M.
 Karen Goldenberg, C.M.
 Dorothy Grant, C.M.
 Jocelyn Greene, C.M.
 H. Wayne Hambly, C.M., O.P.E.I.
 Antony Holland, C.M.
 The Honourable James Knatchbull Hugessen, C.M.
 James D. Irving, C.M.
 Ronald L. Jamieson, C.M., O.Ont.
 Guy Gavriel Kay, C.M.

 Ricardo Larrivée, C.M.
 James William Leech, C.M.
 Jack Long, C.M.
 James Low, C.M.
 The Honourable Edward Lumley, P.C., C.M.
 Ramona Lumpkin, C.M.
 Joseph B. Marshall, C.M., O.N.S.
 Carol Martin, C.M.
 Allison McCain, C.M.
 Frank L. McKinnon, C.M.
 Malcolm Bruce McNiven, C.M.
 James Armstrong Munro, C.M.
 Mona Nemer, C.M., C.Q.
 Kimberly Pate, C.M.
 Alexander Peter Pauk, C.M.
 Michel Phaneuf, C.M.
 Kari Polanyi Levitt, C.M.
 Shana Poplack, C.M.
 Marcia Hampton Rioux, C.M.
 Denise Robert, C.M.
 Ronald Rosenes, C.M.
 Roy Shephard, C.M.
 Karl Siegler, C.M.
 René Simard, C.M.
 Donna Eileen Stewart, C.M.
 Constance L. Sugiyama, C.M.
 Alan Robert Twigg, C.M.
 Fawn Wilson White, C.M.
 Norman Willis, C.M.

Order of Military Merit

Commanders of the Order of Military Merit

 Major-General Stephen Joseph Bowes, C.M.M., M.S.C., M.S.M., C.D.
 Major-General Richard Douglas Foster, C.M.M., C.D.
 Rear-Admiral David Christopher Gardam, C.M.M., C.D. – this is a promotion within the Order
 Major-General David Byron Millar, C.M.M., C.D. – this is a promotion within the Order
 Lieutenant-General Jonathan Holbert Vance, C.M.M., M.S.C., C.D. – this is a promotion within the Order
 Major-General Paul Francis Wynnyk, C.M.M., M.S.M., C.D. – this is a promotion within the Order

Officers of the Order of Military Merit
 Colonel David James Anderson, O.M.M., M.S.M., C.D.
 Captain(N) John Robert Auchterlonie, O.M.M., C.D.
 Colonel Scott Norman Clancy, O.M.M., M.S.M., C.D.
 Colonel Howard Gerard Coombs, O.M.M., C.D.
 Major Joseph Jean Luc Charles Côté, O.M.M., C.D.
 Lieutenant-Colonel Robert Patrick Delaney, O.M.M., C.D.
 Colonel Christian Drouin, O.M.M., M.S.C., C.D.
 Lieutenant-Colonel Robert Bruce Ewing, O.M.M., C.D.
 Colonel Sean Friday, O.M.M., M.S.M., C.D.
 Lieutenant-Colonel Kelly Maria Gash, O.M.M., C.D.
 Colonel Simon Charles Hetherington, O.M.M., M.S.C., C.D.
 Lieutenant-Colonel Lyle Ronald Johnson, O.M.M., C.D.
 Colonel Vihar Govind Joshi, O.M.M., M.S.M., C.D.
 Colonel Joseph Rosaire Aimé Stéphane Lafaut, O.M.M., M.S.C., C.D.
 Brigadier-General Karl Desmond McQuillan, O.M.M., C.D.
 Commander Patrick Montgomery, O.M.M., C.D.
 Brigadier-General Matthew Keith Overton, O.M.M., C.D.
 Lieutenant-Colonel Louis-Henri Rémillard, O.M.M., C.D.
 Colonel Michael Norman Rouleau, O.M.M., M.S.C., C.D.
 Colonel James Carey Taylor, O.M.M., C.D.
 Colonel Carl Jean Turenne, O.M.M., M.S.C., C.D.
 Colonel Steven Joseph Russell Whelan, O.M.M., M.S.M., C.D.

Members of the Order of Military Merit
 Chief Petty Officer 1st Class Joseph Louis Pierre Auger, M.M.M., C.D.
 Master Warrant Officer Antony Shaun Batty, M.M.M., C.D.
 Chief Warrant Officer Joseph Deova Guy Richard Beauchamp, M.M.M., C.D.
 Master Warrant Officer Joseph Pierre Rock Boucher, M.M.M., C.D.
 Master Warrant Officer Ronda Lauran Bowman, M.M.M., C.D.
 Master Warrant Officer Raymond Joseph Brodeur, M.M.M., M.S.M., C.D.
 Petty Officer 1st Class Darcy Lee Leslie Burd, M.M.M., C.D.
 Master Warrant Officer Joseph Aubert Alain Caron, M.M.M., C.D.
 Major Christopher Kevin Catry, M.M.M., C.D.
 Chief Warrant Officer Gorden Roy Cavanagh, M.M.M., C.D.
 Sergeant Michel Félix-Alexandre Charette, M.M.M.
 Master Warrant Officer Troy Charles Chiasson, M.M.M., C.D.
 Warrant Officer Robin John Crane, M.M.M., M.M.V., C.D.
 Chief Warrant Officer Gary Alvin Crosby, M.M.M., C.D.
 Chief Petty Officer 2nd Class Thomas Alfred Curley, M.M.M., C.D.
 Warrant Officer Mark Victor Cushman, M.M.M., C.D.
 Warrant Officer Joseph Éric Michel D'Astous, M.M.M., C.D.
 Chief Petty Officer 1st Class Keith Edward Davidson, M.M.M., C.D.
 Master Warrant Officer Joseph Réal Richard Deschênes, M.M.M., C.D.
 Chief Warrant Officer Joseph Ralph Kevin Donovan, M.M.M., M.S.M., C.D.
 Chief Petty Officer 2nd Class Joseph Gérard Doucet, M.M.M., C.D.
 Warrant Officer Joseph Claude Éric Drouin, M.M.M., C.D.
 Petty Officer 1st Class Dale Thomas Durand, M.M.M., C.D.
 Major Terrance Michael Evoy, M.M.M., C.D.
 Master Warrant Officer Marie Carmen Chantale Gagnon, M.M.M., C.D.
 Chief Warrant Officer Terry Ronald Serge Joseph Garand, M.M.M., C.D.
 Chief Warrant Officer Cathy Alanna Gaudet, M.M.M., C.D.
 Chief Warrant Officer John Henry Graham, M.M.M., M.S.M., C.D.
 Captain Theresa Marie Green, M.M.M., C.D.
 Petty Officer 2nd Class Martin Harrisson, M.M.M., C.D.
 Master Warrant Officer James Matthew Hebert, M.M.M., C.D.
 Warrant Officer Éric Henry, M.M.M., C.D.
 Master Warrant Officer William Joseph Hinchey, M.M.M., C.D.
 Warrant Officer John Charles Hryniw, M.M.M., C.D.
 Warrant Officer Michael William Jackson, M.M.M., M.M.V., C.D.
 Chief Warrant Officer Carol Jalbert, M.M.M., C.D.
 Master Warrant Officer Christopher Percy Kane, M.M.M., C.D.
 Private William Kataquapit, M.M.M.
 Warrant Officer Suzanne Kavanagh, M.M.M., C.D.
 Chief Warrant Officer Michel Clément Kelly, M.M.M., C.D.
 Chief Petty Officer 1st Class Derek Kitching, M.M.M., C.D.
 Master Warrant Officer Carl Kletke, M.M.M., C.D.
 Master Warrant Officer Joseph Dominique Roger Jean Lafond, M.M.M., C.D.
 Warrant Officer Joseph Bertrand Steve Laforge, M.M.M., C.D.
 Warrant Officer Joseph Lionel Jacques Lamarche, M.M.M., C.D.
 Chief Warrant Officer Walter Allan Laughlin, M.M.M., C.D.
 Chief Petty Officer 1st Class Marie Line Laurendeau, M.M.M., C.D.
 Captain Joseph Ubald Yves Lesieur, M.M.M., C.D.
 Master Warrant Officer Michael Edward Lever, M.M.M., C.D.
 Chief Petty Officer 2nd Class Lawrence Lyver, M.M.M., C.D.
 Master Warrant Officer William Joseph MacInnis, M.M.M., C.D.
 Master Warrant Officer Peter Gregory Manuge, M.M.M., C.D.
 Warrant Officer Brent McDonald, M.M.M., C.D.
 Chief Warrant Officer Raymond Nicholas McEachern, M.M.M., C.D.
 Sub-Lieutenant Murray Milton McKnight, M.M.M., C.D.
 Chief Petty Officer 1st Class Michael John Miller, M.M.M., C.D.
 Master Warrant Officer Keith Paul Mitchell, C.V., M.M.M., M.S.M., C.D.
 Chief Petty Officer 2nd Class Barbara Alena Mondelli, M.M.M., C.D.
 Master Warrant Officer Leonard Thomas Murphy, M.M.M., C.D.
 Warrant Officer Erica Oliver, M.M.M., C.D.
 Master Warrant Officer Joseph Antoine Daniel Parenteau, M.M.M., C.D.
 Warrant Officer Robert Patten, M.M.M., C.D.
 Master Warrant Officer Joseph Roger Daniel Paulhus, M.M.M., C.D.
 Warrant Officer Melinda Elizabeth Pearson, M.M.M., C.D.
 Major Albert Mario Pelletier, M.M.M., C.D.
 Warrant Officer Guylaine Marie Alice Plamondon, M.M.M., C.D.
 Major Joseph Charles Sylvain Rhéaume, M.M.M., C.D.
 Master Warrant Officer Scott Stuart Robinson, M.M.M., C.D.
 Chief Warrant Officer Clarence Boyd Rose, M.M.M., C.D.
 Warrant Officer Glenn Rowlandson, M.M.M., C.D.
 Major Joseph Louis René Roy, M.M.M., C.D.
 Chief Warrant Officer Joseph Philemon Jean-Claude Sénécal, M.M.M., C.D.
 Warrant Officer Gerald Benjamin James Shaw, M.M.M., C.D.
 Major Ryan Denis Smid, M.M.M., M.B., C.D.
 Master Warrant Officer James Maurice Smith, M.M.M., C.D.
 Master Warrant Officer Matthew Michael Taylor, M.M.M., C.D.
 Master Warrant Officer Michael Richard Thompson, M.M.M., C.D.
 Warrant Officer Derek Ashley Thompson, M.M.M., C.D.
 Master Warrant Officer Louise Toussaint-Langlois, M.M.M., C.D.
 Master Warrant Officer Wayne Harold Trainor, M.M.M., C.D.
 Chief Warrant Officer Joseph Léo Stéfan Tremblay, M.M.M., C.D.
 Sergeant Lori Elizabeth Veitch, M.M.M., C.D.
 Chief Petty Officer 1st Class Michel Vigneault, M.M.M., C.D.
 Chief Warrant Officer Helen Gayle Wheeler, M.M.M., C.D.
 Sergeant Timothy Alexander Woznow, M.M.M., C.D.

Order of Merit of the Police Forces

Officers of the Order of Merit of the Police Forces

 Deputy Chief Stephen Beckett, O.O.M.
 Chief Charles J. Bordeleau, O.O.M.
 Assistant Commissioner Kevin Charles Brosseau, O.O.M.
 Deputy Chief Trevor Daniel Daroux, O.O.M.
 Deputy Chief Constable Robert Alexander Downie, O.O.M.
 Chief Frank J. Elsner, O.O.M. – This is a promotion within the Order
 Director Michel Foucher, O.O.M.
 Director General Debra Frazer, O.O.M.
 Director Francis Gobeil, O.O.M.
 Chief Troy Hagen, O.O.M. – This is a promotion within the Order
 Deputy Chief Bruce Kenneth Herridge, O.O.M. – This is a promotion within the Order
 Chief Mark Douglas Mander, O.O.M.
 Chief Thomas Andrew McGrogan, O.O.M.
 Assistant Commissioner Gilles Michaud, O.O.M.
 Deputy Chief Murray William Stooke, O.O.M.

Members of the Order of Merit of the Police Forces

 Chief Superintendent Michael E. Armstrong, M.O.M.
 Chief John T. W. Bates, M.O.M.
 Deputy Chief Lyle T. Beaudoin, M.O.M.
 Chief Jean-Michel Blais, M.O.M.
 Chief Superintendent Roderick Neil Callum Booth, M.O.M.
 Director Louis Bruneault, M.O.M.
 Inspector Kenneth Burton, M.O.M.
 Deputy Chief Mark Stephen Chatterbok, M.O.M.
 Detective Staff Sergeant Dominic S. C. Chong, M.O.M.
 Chief Superintendent Warren Paul Coons, M.O.M.
 Chief Superintendent Gary James Couture, M.O.M.
 Chief Superintendent Marlin A. Degrand, M.O.M.
 Director Michel Desgagné, M.O.M.
 Chief Officer Neil Dubord, M.O.M.
 Constable Stéphane Eid, M.O.M.
 Chief Leanne Jane Fitch, M.O.M.
 Sergeant Brian A. Foote, M.O.M.
 Chief Superintendent William Charles Fordy, M.O.M.
 Chief Inspector Mario Fournier, M.O.M.
 Sergeant Robert Joseph Stephane Gallant, M.O.M.
 Captain Frédérick Gaudreau, M.O.M.
 Detective Staff Sergeant Frank L. Goldschmidt, M.O.M.
 Superintendent Robert Gould, M.O.M.
 Superintendent Kevin Hackett, M.O.M.
 Chief Laurie L. Hayman, M.O.M.
 Superintendent Kenneth Wayne Heslop, M.O.M.
 Chief Superintendent Angela Louise Howe, M.O.M.
 Corporal Laurel Karen Kading, M.O.M.
 Deputy Chief Wayne Kalinski, M.O.M.
 Superintendent Daniel Kinsella, M.O.M.
 Chief Superintendent Scott Alexander Kolody, M.O.M.
 Staff Sergeant Darren Laur, M.O.M.
 Staff Sergeant Andre Pierre LeClair, M.O.M.
 Ms. Rita Lee-Irvine, M.O.M.
 Deputy Chief Allan R. Lekun, M.O.M.
 Chief Jean Paul Levesque, M.O.M.
 Chief Yung-Kai Liu, M.O.M.
 Chief Superintendent Peter Thomas Malo, M.O.M.
 Deputy Chief Constable Delbir Manak, M.O.M.
 Director Randy Mar, M.O.M.
 Superintendent Anne McConnell, M.O.M.
 Constable David McFadden, M.O.M.
 Chief Peter Joseph McIsaac, M.O.M.
 Superintendent Robin Emmanuel McNeil, M.O.M.
 Detective Inspector Thomas A. Murphy, M.O.M.
 Inspector Mark W. Neufeld, M.O.M.
 Detective Inspector Christopher A. Nicholas, M.O.M.
 Detective Inspector William Charles Olinyk, M.O.M.
 Chief Dennis James Poole, M.O.M.
 Superintendent Michael Duthie Porteous, M.O.M.
 Superintendent Gregory Robert Preston, M.O.M.
 Staff Sergeant Peter J. Quilty, M.O.M.
 Sergeant Supervisor Pascal Richard, M.O.M.
 Deputy Chief Frank Roselli, M.O.M.
 Superintendent Lorne Schwartz, M.O.M.
 Deputy Chief T. Brent Shea, M.O.M.
 Superintendent Jeffrey H. Sim, M.O.M.
 Deputy Chief Alban Gerard Singleton, M.O.M.
 Detective Inspector James M. G. Smyth, M.O.M.
 Ms. Florence Stewart, M.O.M.
 Deputy Chief Constable Leslie John Sylven, M.O.M.
 Superintendent John E. Tod, M.O.M.
 Chief Superintendent Larry Tremblay, M.O.M.
 Staff Sergeant Lynne Turnbull, M.O.M.
 Deputy Chief Desmond Walsh, M.O.M.

Most Venerable Order of the Hospital of St. John of Jerusalem

Knights and Dames of the Order of St. John
 Honorary Colonel Robert Harold Vandewater, MB
 Robert Hector White, ON

Commanders of the Order of St. John
 Kimberley Eyre, ON
 John Roland McDougall, AB
 Terry Lee Carter-Squire, MB
 Jean Kathryn Chute, BC
 Gary Gerald Corcoran, NL
 David John Griffiths, NL
 Edwin Holder, London, ON
 James Patrick Jeffries, C.D., MB
 Brent Donald Johnson, AB
 Honorary Colonel Susan Margaret Kathler, C.D., MB

Officers of the Order of St. John
 Sergeant Marc Joseph Luc Boucher, CD, QC
 Virginie Danielle Latour, NS
 Shaun McGrath, ON
 Raymond Ormerod, ON
 Second Lieutenant Owen Peter Patterson, NS
 Mervin Wayne Unger, BC
 Paul Lloyd Vienneau, NS
 Judith Anne Barker, ON
 Marika Lemstra Beaumont, ON
 Allan Burnell Bird, C.D., ON
 Master Warrant Officer William Mark Charlton, C.D., ON
 Sean Michael Large, ON
 Bonnie Jean McIntosh, ON
 Corporal Carolyn Kimberly Picard, ON
 Diane Margaret Rende, ON
 Superintendent John Paul Richards, MOM, BC
 Dawn Elizabeth Mary Roach, ON
 Joseph Bruce Varner, ON

Members of the Order of St. John
 Trent Latchman Akalu, ON
 Anna Catherine Armstrong, ON
 Kathy Lok Yin Au-Yeung, BC
 Brian James Belanger, ON
 James Bertoia, ON
 Michèle Brunette, ON
 Lieutenant-Colonel (Retired) Gary Ernest Burton, C.D., ON
 Patricia Lynn Ann Coleman, NS
 Christopher Dueck, ON
 Joyce Fowler, ON
 Captain John Colin Hodgson, AB
 Carol Ann Holland, ON
 Sam Kwok, ON
 Lieutenant-Colonel Henri Levasseur, C.D., QC
 Lieutenant-Colonel (Retired) Grant MacDonald, ON
 Patrick Lynn Martin, ON
 Jennifer Mayo, ON
 John Arnold Molyneaux, ON
 Shawn William Nutt, ON
 Pyer-Luc Parent, QC
 Sergeant Kristopher Neil Porlier, AB
 Matthew Rate, ON
 Robert Robertson, ON
 Cynthia Rodrigue, QC
 Earl Patrick Shea, ON
 Konrad Shum, BC
 Corporal Robert David Skelly, ON
 Ute Ellen Dagmar Teubner, ON
 Mary Dora Jean Woolrich, ON
 Laurie Anne Anderson, AB
 Kavitha Balaji, NT
 Mallory Jayne Black, MB
 Clarence Din Kwan Cheng, ON
 Judy Ann Chiu, BC
 Warren Mark Cook, BC
 Michelle Covi Haswell, ON
 Victoria Dorosch, ON
 Nancy Eunson, ON
 Shirley Ellen Evans, ON
 Commissioner Christopher Dorn Lewis, ON
 His Honour, the Honourable Doctor Donald Meredith, ON
 Danielle Andrea Million, AB
 Ross Nicholls, BC
 Tammy Kay Olsen, BC
 Richard Todd Pipe, ON
 Audrey Pryor, NL
 William Cox Reiach, ON
 Jennifer Susan Reiche, ON
 Kevin Rowe, NT
 Phyllis Elizabeth Schneider, ON
 Stefanie Simeone, QC
 Lieutenant(N) Lou Andrew Taddeo, C.D., ON
 Alexander Tsibulski, MB
 Roberta Helen Ursel, BC
 Robin Douglas Walker, ON
 Chris Wilson, NU
 Alexander Ka Kiu Yan, BC
 Constable Cecil Edward Young, ON

Provincial Honours

National Order of Québec

Grand Officers of the National Order of Québec

 Claude Béland, G.O.Q.
 Claude Castonguay, G.O.Q.

Honorary Grand Officer
 Kent Nagano, G.O.Q.

Officers of the National Order of Québec

 Manon Barbeau, O.Q.
 Louise Beaudoin, O.Q.
 Alain Bouchard, O.Q.
 Boris Brott, O.Q. 
 Gabriel Filteau, O.Q. 
 Ross Gaudreault, O.Q. 
 Dany Laferrière, O.Q. 
 Marguerite Mendell, O.Q.
 Benoît Pelletier, O.Q.
 Hervé Pomerleau, O.Q. 
 Larry Rossy, O.Q. 
 Madeleine Roy, O.Q. 
 Denis Vaugeois, O.Q.

Knight of the National Order of Québec

 Yves Beauchamp, C.Q. 
 Jocelyn Demers, C.Q. 
 Hélène Desperrier, C.Q.
 François Dompierre, C.Q. 
 Pierre Fortin, C.Q. 
 Amina Gerba, C.Q. 
 Georges-Hébert Germain, C.Q. 
 Monique Giroux, C.Q. 
 Joé Juneau, C.Q. 
 Lucia Kowaluk, C.Q. 
 Marie Lavigne, C.Q. 
 Gérard Le Chêne, C.Q. 
 Michel Lemieux, C.Q. 
 Pauline Morrier, C.Q.
 Victor Pilon, C.Q. 
 Barry Posner, C.Q. 
 Her Worship Colette Roy Laroche, C.Q. 
 Gilles Vincent, C.Q.
 Stanley Vollant, C.Q.

Saskatchewan Order of Merit

 No 2014 list (it is shared with 2015)

Order of Ontario

 Mary Anne Chambers – Cabinet Minister and MPP
 Ming-Tat Cheung – cardiologist and medical researcher
 Michael Dan – neurosurgeon and philanthropists 
 Don Drummond – economist
 Rick Green – performer, writer and advocate for people with ADD
 Patrick Gullane – head and neck surgeon
 Joseph Halstead – civil servant and administrator 
 Alis Kennedy – Métis leader
 Sylvie Lamoureux – teacher, scholar, and academic
 Gilles LeVasseur – lawyer, economist and professor
 Gary Levy – founding Director of the Multi-Organ Transplant Program at Toronto General Hospital 
 Sidney B. Linden – former Chief Justice of the Ontario Court of Justice
 Barbara MacQuarrie – advocate for women's rights
 Eva Marszewski – founder and executive director of Peacebuilders International
 Marilyn McHarg – Co-founder and former executive director of the Canadian branch of Doctors Without Borders/Médécins Sans Frontières
 Hans Messner – scientist and physician
 James Murray – philanthropist
 Robert Nixon – former Minister of Finance and leader of the Ontario Liberal Party
 Dhun Noria – surgical pathologist
 Maryka Omatsu – retired Ontario Court Justice and Canada's first Asian-Canadian female judge
 Charles Pachter – artist
 John Ralston Saul – writer and lecturer
 Najmul Siddiqui – entrepreneur, community leader and philanthropist
 Jeffrey Turnbull – physician, humanitarian and medical director of Ottawa Inner City Health
 Dolores Wawia – pioneer in native education
 David Williams – Canadian astronaut, physician and scientist
 Warren Winkler – former labour lawyer, mediator and Chief Justice of Ontario

Order of British Columbia

 David R. Podmore
 Douglas Coupland
 George Hungerford (2013)
 K. Barry Marsden
 John Brian Patrick Quinn
 Bob Rennie
 Chief Councillor Ellis Ross
 Dr. Aubrey Tingle
 Tung Chan
 Dr. John Cairns
 Dr. Roger Barnsley
 Dr. William (Bill) Clifford
 Dr. Gregory Fahlman (2013)
 Leslie Diamond
 Paul Lacerte
 Gloria Cuccione
 Dr. Hal Weinberg
 Dr. James Hogg
 Jane Hungerford
 Chief Chester Moore
 H. Anne Lippert
 Dana Brynelsen
 Peter Bentley
 Donald Lindsay
 The Honourable Leonard Marchand
 Rudolph North
 Lorne R. Segal

Alberta Order of Excellence

 Sharon Carry
 Tony Cashman
 Morris Flewwelling
 Colin Glassco
 Julia Hamilton
 Wilton Littlechild
 Fred Mannix
 Reinhard Mühlenfeld (* deceased)

Order of Prince Edward Island

 H. Wayne Hambly, CM
 Honourable H. Wade MacLauchlan, CM
 Heather Leanne Moyse

Order of Manitoba

 Lorraine E. Brandson
 Robert Bryan Brennan
 Thomas Ralston Denton
 Donald Duguid
 Ronald (Sam) Fabro
 Raymonde Gagné
 Allan Gotlieb
 Israel Imoukhuede Idonije
 Bob Irving
 Jennifer Judith Jones
 Hermann Kar-Sang Lee
 Roland Penner 
 Carole A. Vivier
 Doris Sarah Young

Order of New Brunswick

 Roger Augustine
 Wayne Curtis
 Lorraine Diotte
 Roxanne R. Fairweather
 Ivan Hicks
 Himanshu Kumar Mukherjee
 Guy A. Richard
 Cheryl Robertson
 Claude Snow
 Roch Voisine, O.C.

Order of Nova Scotia

 Walter Marven Borden, C.M., O.N.S, DCL, DLitt
 Dr. Richard Ballon Goldbloom, O.C., O.N.S., BSc, MD, CM, FRCPC, DLitt, LLD
 Dr. Stanley Paul Kutcher, O.N.S., BA, MA, MD, FRCPC, FCAHS
 Dr. Wanda Elaine Thomas Bernard, C.M., O.N.S., PhD, RSW
 Ruth Holmes Whitehead, O.N.S., LLD

Order of Newfoundland and Labrador

 Margaret Kearney
 Kevin St. George
 Sara Rita Sexton
 Colleen Kennedy
 Gilbert Linstead
 Dr. Jane Stuart Green
 Bridget Foster.

Canadian Bravery Decorations

Star of Courage

 Master Corporal Shawn Gregory Bretschneider
 Sergeant Janick Joseph Benoit Gilbert, C.D. (posthumous)
 Master Corporal Marco A. Journeyman, C.D.
 Master Corporal Maxime Bernard Lahaye-Lemay
 Daniel Morrison
 Sergeant Daniel Villeneuve, M.B., C.D.

Medal of Bravery

 Marcus Lucas Alexander
 Julien Allard
 Larry James Angasuk Jr.
 Constable Andrew Robert Aucoin
 Sergeant Paul Charles Avanthay
 Kina Raven Beardy
 Clayton Joseph Beck
 Normand Bourgon
 Kevin Samuel Carras
 Constable Kevin Carroll
 Sheldon Charles Catholique
 Justin Tak Chan (posthumous)
 Constable Norbert Alexander Constant
 Pierre Davignon
 Magalie Dumoulin
 Constable James Arthur Elvish
 Sébastien Frappier
 Constable Todd Anton Ronald Glemser
 Adrien Grenier
 Dennis George Kerridge (posthumous)
 James Patrick Kitchen
 Devin Knot
 Juliette Rose Kokokons
 Joshua Lasas
 Warrant Officer Angel Margaret MacEachern, C.D.
 Brandon L. Manion
 Timothy Mason
 David Bruce Mayo
 Constable Susan McCormick
 Constable Clark McKever
 Jean-Paul Muir, C.D.
 Kelly Natomagan
 Logan Natomagan
 Carly Laura Nikirk
 Andrei Odorico
 Constable Kenneth Ogima
 Teddy John Allen Omilgoituk
 Brett Austin Opikokew
 Sergeant Jacob J. Perkins
 Constable Mark Reast
 Brennan Ellard Richardson
 Marko Romic
 Constable Jason Rybak
 Constable Stephen Lloyd Smulan
 Jonathan Storring
 Blaine Switzer
 Jonathan Thomason
 Giancarlo Torino
 Jason Daniel Totté
 Master Corporal Jean-François Vaillancourt
 Mark Van Sickle (posthumous)
 Donovan H. Vandestadt
 Jeffrey Wakeham
 George Thomas Ward
 William Dennis Ward
 Anthony Williams (posthumous)
 Corporal Scott Joseph Young
 Marcus Lucas Alexander
 Julien Allard
 Larry James Angasuk Jr.
 Constable Andrew Robert Aucoin
 Sergeant Paul Charles Avanthay
 Kina Raven Beardy
 Clayton Joseph Beck
 Normand Bourgon
 Kevin Samuel Carras
 Constable Kevin Carroll
 Sheldon Charles Catholique
 Justin Tak Chan (posthumous)
 Constable Norbert Alexander Constant
 Pierre Davignon
 Magalie Dumoulin
 Constable James Arthur Elvish
 Sébastien Frappier
 Constable Todd Anton Ronald Glemser
 Adrien Grenier
 Dennis George Kerridge (posthumous)
 James Patrick Kitchen
 Devin Knot
 Juliette Rose Kokokons
 Joshua Lasas
 Warrant Officer Angel Margaret MacEachern, C.D.
 Brandon L. Manion
 Timothy Mason
 David Bruce Mayo
 Constable Susan McCormick
 Constable Clark McKever
 Jean-Paul Muir, C.D.
 Kelly Natomagan
 Logan Natomagan
 Carly Laura Nikirk
 Andrei Odorico
 Constable Kenneth Ogima
 Teddy John Allen Omilgoituk
 Brett Austin Opikokew
 Sergeant Jacob J. Perkins
 Constable Mark Reast
 Brennan Ellard Richardson
 Marko Romic
 Constable Jason Rybak
 Constable Stephen Lloyd Smulan
 Jonathan Storring
 Blaine Switzer
 Jonathan Thomason
 Giancarlo Torino
 Jason Daniel Totté
 Master Corporal Jean-François Vaillancourt
 Mark Van Sickle (posthumous)
 Donovan H. Vandestadt
 Jeffrey Wakeham
 George Thomas Ward
 William Dennis Ward
 Anthony Williams (posthumous)
 Corporal Scott Joseph Young

Meritorious Service Decorations

Second Award of the Meritorious Service Cross (Military Division)

 Major-General Dean James Milner, O.M.M., M.S.C., C.D.

Meritorious Service Cross (Military Division)

 Captain Aaron Noble, M.S.C.
 Lieutenant General Daniel P. Bolger, M.S.C. (United States Army)
 Warrant Officer Joseph Claude Camille Pelletier, M.S.C., C.D.

Second Award of the Meritorious Service Medal (Military Division)

 Chief Warrant Officer Daniel Joseph Laurendan Brissette, M.S.M., C.D.
 Colonel Gordon David Corbould, M.S.M., C.D.
 Colonel Joseph Albert Paul Pierre St-Cyr, M.S.M., C.D.

Meritorious Service Medal (Military Division)

 Major Joseph Henri Christian Bergeron, M.S.M., C.D.
 Warrant Officer Joseph Damien Roger Bibaud, M.S.M., C.D.
 Major Scott Charles Alfred Bland, M.S.M., C.D.
 Brigadier General Jack L. Briggs II, M.S.M., (United States Air Force)
 Lieutenant-Commander Douglas Ian Campbell, M.S.M.,
 Colonel Kenneth Chadder, O.M.M., M.S.M., C.D.
 Lieutenant-Colonel Joseph Marcel Edmond Chevarie, M.S.M., C.D.
 Commander Jeffrey Campbell Climenhaga, M.S.M., C.D.
 Colonel Grant Fernand Dame, M.S.M., C.D.
 Colonel Peter Samson Dawe, M.S.M., C.D.
 Captain Gregory Alan Dixon, M.S.M., C.D.
 Captain Aaron Noble, M.S.M.
 Warrant Officer Allan Roy Upshall, M.S.M., C.D.
 Captain(N) Haydn Clyde Edmundson, M.S.M., C.D.
 Captain Islam Elkorazati, M.S.M.
 Colonel Philip Frederick Charles Garbutt, O.M.M., M.S.M., C.D.
 Colonel Michael Richard Gibson, M.S.M., C.D.
 Chief Warrant Officer Stuart Gordon Hartnell, M.M.M., M.S.M., C.D.
 Brigadier-General Douglas Craig Hilton, O.M.M., M.S.M., C.D.
 Petty Officer 1st Class Jeffery Kenney, M.S.M., C.D.
 Sub-Lieutenant David Ronald Lewis, M.S.M.
 Colonel Norman Peter Litterini, M.S.M. (United States Army)
 Lieutenant-Colonel Sylvain Ménard, M.S.M., C.D.
 Captain(N) Rebecca Louise Patterson, M.S.M., C.D.
 Lieutenant-Colonel Paul Gregory Pickell, M.S.M., C.D.
 Colonel Jean François Riffou, M.S.M., C.D. 
 Chief Petty Officer 2nd Class Daniel William Rowe, M.S.M., C.D. 
 Sergeant Jessie David Scheller, M.S.M. 
 Captain Shane Alexander Smith, M.S.M., C.D.
 Colonel Gregory Ronald Smith, M.S.M., C.D. 
 Major Leonard Kerry St. George, M.S.M., C.D.
 Captain(N) Douglas Michael Charles Young, M.S.M., C.D.
 Brigadier-General Todd Nelson Balfe, M.S.M., C.D.
 Chief Petty Officer 1st Class Robert Lee Brown, M.M.M., M.S.M., C.D.
 Chief Warrant Officer Martin Joseph Bruno Colbert, M.M.M., M.S.M., C.D.
 Lieutenant-Colonel John Stanley Fife, M.S.M., C.D.
 Colonel Paul Timothy Goddard, M.S.M., C.D.
 Lieutenant-Commander Christopher Daniel Holland, M.S.M., C.D.
 Major Mohamed-Ali Laaouan, M.S.M., C.D.
 Lieutenant-Colonel Joseph Christian Guy Leblanc, M.S.M., C.D.
 Corporal Clinton Jeffrey Lewis, M.S.M., C.D.
 Warrant Officer Michael David Mar, M.S.M., C.D.
 Captain Trevor Mark Pellerin, M.S.M., C.D.
 Lieutenant-Colonel Sean Patrick Lewis, M.S.M., C.D.
 Lieutenant-Colonel Stephen MacDonald, M.S.M., C.D.
 Chief Warrant Officer Gordon William Floyd Morrison, M.M.M., M.S.M., C.D.
 Lieutenant(N) Joseph Jocelyn Nadeau, M.S.M., C.D.
 Major Robin Kent Nickerson, M.S.M., C.D.
 Lieutenant-Colonel James Robert Ostler, M.S.M., C.D.
 Lieutenant-Colonel Roch Pelletier, M.S.M., C.D.
 Captain(N) Ronald Gerald Pumphrey, M.S.M., C.D.
 Warrant Officer Pasqualino Rizzo, M.S.M., C.D.
 Chief Warrant Officer Robert Joseph Thompson, M.S.M., C.D.
 Captain(N) Angus Ian Topshee, M.S.M., C.D.
 Colonel Peter Joseph Williams, M.S.M., C.D.

Secret appointments
 8 March 2014: His Excellency the Right Honourable David Johnston, Governor General and Commander-in-Chief of Canada, on the recommendation of the Chief of the Defence Staff, has awarded two Meritorious Service Medals (Military Division) to members of the Canadian Special Operations Forces Command for military activities of high standard that have brought great honour to the Canadian Forces and to Canada. For security and operational reasons, recipients' names and citations have not been released.
 20 December 2014: His Excellency the Right Honourable David Johnston, Governor General and Commander-in-Chief of Canada, on the recommendation of the Chief of the Defence Staff, has awarded two Meritorious Service Medals (Military Division) to members of the Chief of Defence Intelligence, and one Meritorious Service Medal (Military Division) to a member of the Canadian Special Operations Forces Command for military activities of high professional standard that have brought great honour to the Canadian Armed Forces and to Canada. For security and operational reasons, recipients' names and citations have not been released.

Commonwealth and Foreign Orders, Decorations and Medal awarded to Canadians

From Her Majesty The Queen in Right of Australia

Australian Active Service Medal with International Coalition Against Terrorism Clasp

 Captain Carson Choy
 Captain Bradley Hardiman

From Her Majesty The Queen in Right of the United Kingdom

Companion of the Most Distinguished Order of Saint Michael and Saint George

 Mr. Laurent Beaudoin,

Operational Service Medal with Afghanistan Clasp

 Major Andrew J. Webb
 Captain Alison Lucas

From the President of Austria

Grand Decoration of Honour for Services to the Republic of Austria

 Mr. Joel Bell

Decoration of Merit (Silver) 
 Mr. Shawn Gibbons

From the President of the Republic of Chile

Grand Cross of the Order of Bernardo O'Higgins

 Mr. Lawrence David Lederman

From Her Majesty The Queen of Denmark

Knight of the Royal Order of the Dannebrog

 Mr. Kenn Harper
 Mr. Arne Nordtorp

From the President of the Republic of Finland

Knight, 1st Class of the Order of the Lion of Finland

 Mr. Patrick Kenniff

From the President of the French Republic

Knight of the National Order of the Legion of Honour

 Mr. Reginald B. Allen
 Mr. Russel Bannock
 Mr. Eric Isaiah Bezanson
 Mr. Donald Joseph Bliss
 Mr. Frederick Brown
 Mr. Ronald William Butcher
 Mr. Archibald Donald Campbell
 Mr. Peter Goodwin Chance
 Mr. John Colson
 Mr. Ronald E. Cox
 Mr. James Andrew Crooks
 Mr. Albert E. Culley
 Mr. Marshall Thomas Desveaux
 Mr. Albert Doiron
 Mr. Roy Ernest Eddy
 Mr. James Francis Edwards
 Mr. Leonard William Fitzgerald
 Mr. Harold Andrew Furlong
 Mr. Walter Kenneth Georgeson
 Mr. Louis Godin
 Mr. Wilmore Stanley Hamilton
 Mr. Kenneth Charles Hanna
 Mr. Russell Frederick Hubley
 Mr. Lloyd Edward Hunt
 Mr. Raymond Donald Knight
 Mr. George Nicholas Kusyk
 Mr. Kenneth Charles Lett
 Mr. James Douglas Lindsay
 Mr. Rex C. F. Luckhart
 Mr. Paul Emile Maisonneuve
 Mr. William Martin
 Mr. Joseph Meagher
 Mr. Albert Henry Minnings
 Mr. James Moffat
 Mr. Reid Byron Myers
 Mr. Kenneth Owen Newell
 Mr. Earl Grant Nisbet (deceased)
 Mr. Edward James O'Halloran (deceased)
 Mr. John Harold Phillips
 Mr. Kenneth John Pratt
 Mr. John Walter Ross
 Mr. Roy Rushton
 Mr. Eugene Raymond Sanford
 Mr. Thomas Patterson Scade
 Mr. Arthur Britton Smith
 Mr. William G. Talbot
 Mr. William Wigglesworth Turner
 Mr. John Jack Vincent Watts
 Mr. Thomas Ross Wheler
 Note – 17 May 2014: The Government of Canada has also approved the award of the National Order of the Legion of Honour (Knight) to all other eligible Canadian veterans, approved by the Government of the Republic of France, who participated in the Allied Invasion of Normandy and Provence. This entitles the accepting and wearing of the decoration. The Chancellery of Honours will keep a record of the names of the recipients.
 Mr. Claude C. Boulanger

Officer of the Order of the Academic Palms

 Mr. Réjean Boivin

Knight of the Order of the Academic Palms

 Mr. Robert Boily
 Mr. Luc Bureau
 Ms. Linda Cardinal
 Ms. Christine Piette
 Mr. Vania Atudorei

Commander of the Order of Arts and Letters

 Mr. Dany Laferrière

Officer of the Order of Arts and Letters
 Mr. Neil Young, O.C., O.Man
 Ms. Gail Dexter Lord
 Ms. Monique Giroux

Knight of the Order of Arts and Letters
 Ms. Chantal Pontbriand
 Mr. Douglas Coupland
 Ms. Josette Deslauriers Normandeau
 Ms. Diana Krall
 Mr. Guy Mignault
 Mr. Anthony Phelps
 Mr. Serge Thibodeau
 Mr. Jean-Marc Vallée
 Mr. Ian Wallace

National Defence Medal, Bronze Echelon
 Major Claudie Thériault

Medal of Honour of Labour, Grand Gold Echelon
 Mr. Armand Essiminy

From the President of the Federal Republic of Germany

Grand Cross 1st Class of the Order of Merit of the Federal Republic of Germany
 The Honourable Noël A. Kinsella, P.C.

Cross of the Order of Merit of the Federal Republic of Germany
 Ms. Annemarie Heinze
 Professor Henry Horst Mantsch

From the President of Hungary

Commander's Cross of the Order of Merit of Hungary (civil division)
 Professor József Tóth
 Mr. Gábor Finta

From the President of the Republic of Italy

Commander of the Order of Merit of the Republic of Italy
 Mr. Howard Alper

From His Majesty The Emperor of Japan

Order of the Rising Sun, Gold Rays with Rosette
 Her Worship Hazel McCallion

Order of the Rising Sun, Gold Rays with Neck Ribbon
 Mr. Michael Wade Donnelly

From His Majesty The King of the Netherlands

Inauguration Medal (2013)
 Master Warrant Officer Daryl Wayne Corbett
 Major Timothy McClure
 Warrant Officer John Alexander Toth

From the Secretary General of the North Atlantic Treaty Organization

NATO Meritorious Service Medal
 Mr. Zobair David Deen
 Colonel Paul Fleury
 Lieutenant-General Marquis Hainse
 Colonel Peter Scott
 Mr. Scott Bruce
 Master Warrant Officer Shaun Patrick Prendergast
 Lieutenant-Commander Dale Turetski

From the President of the Republic of Poland

Commander's Cross of the Order of Merit (with Star) of the Republic of Poland
 Mr. Jesse Flis

Officer's Cross of the Order of Merit of the Republic of Poland
 Mr. Edward Henryk Sliz

Knight's Cross of the Order of Merit of the Republic of Poland
 Mr. Borys Wrzesnewskyj
 Ms. Halina Drozdzal

Officer's Cross of the Order of Polonia Restituta
 Mr. Ireneusz Sieranski

Knight's Cross of the Order of Polonia Restituta
 Mr. Henryk Bystrzycki
 Mr. Józef Bełz

Gold Cross of Merit of the Republic of Poland
 Ms. Jane Skoryna
 Mr. Jozef Palimaka

Silver Cross of Merit of the Republic of Poland
 Ms. Natalia Kusendova
 Mr. Marcin Gradka
 Mr. Boleslaw Dranski
 Mr. Wladyslaw Lakomy
 Mr. Bogdan Slominski
 Mr. Marek Wichlacz
 Mr. Boleslaw Wojdylo
 Mr. Jan Zubrzycki

Cross of Freedom and Solidarity of the Republic of Poland
 Mr. Waldermar Jarocki

Long Marital Life Medal
 Mr. Aleksander Dębski
 Mrs. Stanislawa Dębska

From the President of the Republic of Portugal

Commander of the Order of Infante D. Henrique
 Ms. Nelly Furtado

Commander of the Order of Merit of the Republic of Portugal
 Mr. Manuel da Costa
 Mr. Emanuel Linhares
 Mrs. Ana Paula Lopes
 Mr. Duarte M. Miranda

Honorary Member of the Order of Merit of the Republic of Portugal
 Mrs. Kátia Caramujo
 Mr. Jack Prazeres

From the Government of the Federation of Russia

Order of Friendship of the Russian Federation
 The Right Honourable Jean Chrétien,

From the President of Serbia

Gold Medal of Merit
 Mr. Michael Chossudovsky

From His Majesty The King of Spain

Silver Cross of the Order of Civil Merit
 Mr. Barry Brown

From the President of the United States of America

Legion of Merit (Degree of Officer)
 Brigadier-General Alexander Donald Meinzinger
 Major-General Brett Douglas Cairns
 Brigadier-General Gordon David Corbould
 Brigadier-General Christopher J. Coates
 Colonel Scott Anthony Howden
 Commodore William Truelove

Legion of Merit (Degree of Legionnaire)
 Captain(N) Haydn C. Edmundson

Bronze Star Medal
 Major Robert P. Ryan
 Colonel Stéphane P. Boucher
 Colonel Peter K. Scott
 Lieutenant-Colonel Pierre C. St-Laurent
 Colonel Ian Lightbody
 Colonel Ivars A. Miezitis
 Colonel Bryan H. Gagné
 Acting Colonel John M. C. Valtonen

Defense Meritorious Service Medal
 Major J. L. Guy Langevin

Meritorious Service Medal, First Oak Leaf Cluste
 Colonel Patrick J. B. Carpentier

Meritorious Service Medal
 Major Denis G. Gagnon
 Lieutenant-Colonel Lynn S. Stoddart
 Major Michael Urban McCarthy
 Major Marc G. Diamond
 Captain(N) Pierre C. Dickinson
 Major Michel Poirier
 Major Mark Bradley Fathers
 Major Ricardo Dias
 Major Richard A. Jolette
 Major Vahe Ohanessian
 Lieutenant-Colonel James R. Ostler
 Colonel Jean François Riffou
 Major Jeffrey James Schamehorn
 Major Christopher John Young
 Lieutenant-Colonel Robert G. Boucher
 Major Michael E. Wells
 Captain William R. Cooper
 Captain Jeffrey Tebo
 Major Linda R. Ballenthin
 Lieutenant-Colonel Douglas Clark
 Major Bryce M. Graham
 Major David N. Jane
 Lieutenant-Colonel J. E. Ghislain Rancourt
 Lieutenant-Colonel Derek R. Spencer
 Colonel Blaise Francis Frawley

Air Medal
 Warrant Officer Lisa F. Powers
 Captain Gareth D. Carter

Erratums of Commonwealth and Foreign Orders, Decorations and Medal awarded to Canadians

Corrections of 25 January 2014
 The notice published on page 2212 of the September 28, 2013, issue of the Canada Gazette, Part I, is hereby amended as follows:From the President of the French Republic, the National Defence Medal, Bronze Echelon with "Génie and Missions d'opérations extérieures" clasps to Major Michaël R. G. Godard;
 The notice published on page 2422 of the October 26, 2013, issue of the Canada Gazette, Part I, is hereby amended as follows: From the President of the French Republic a Knight of the National Order of the Legion of Honour to Sister Dorothée Dubé;
 The notice published on page 3004 of the December 28, 2013, issue of the Canada Gazette, Part I, is hereby amended as follows: From the President of the French Republic, the National Defence Medal, Bronze Echelon to Captain Marc-André La Haye

Corrections of 27 September 2014
 The notice published on page 2284 of the August 30, 2014, issue of the Canada Gazette, Part I, is hereby amended as follows: From the Government of the French Republic, an Officer of the Order of Arts and Letters to Ms. Chantal Pontbriand

Corrections of 25 October 2014
 The notice published on page 2284 of the August 30, 2014, issue of the Canada Gazette, Part I, is hereby amended as follows: From the President of the French Republic of France, the President of the Republic of France has not appointed Mr. Christian Dumais-Lvowski to the National Order of the Legion of Honour (Knight).

Correction of 6 December 2014
 The notice published on page 2440 of the September 27, 2014, issue of the Canada Gazette, Part I, is hereby amended as follows: From the President of the United States of America, the Bronze Star Medal to Lieutenant-Colonel Pierre C. St-Laurent

References 

Monarchy in Canada